Fairy Tail is a Japanese manga series written and illustrated by Hiro Mashima that has been translated into various languages and spawned a substantial media franchise. The series follows the adventures of the dragon-slayer Natsu Dragneel, as he is searching for the dragon Igneel and partners with seventeen-year-old celestial wizard Lucy Heartfilia, who joins the titular guild. In Japan, the series has been published by Kodansha in Weekly Shōnen Magazine since the magazine's issue of August 23, 2006 and in tankōbon format since December 15, 2006. The series spans over 545 chapters and 63 volumes. Hiro Mashima has announced in his notes in the release of volume 61 that the Fairy Tail manga series is set to end with volume 63 being the final release for the main series.

In North America, Kodansha USA and Random House currently serializes Fairy Tail in Crunchyroll Manga simultaneously with Japan. The English-language adaptation was originally published by the now-defunct Del Rey Manga beginning in March 2008. Since then, Kodansha USA and Random House replaced Del Ray with the 13th volume in May 2011, reprinting the earlier 12 volumes under their name, and also publishes them digitally on the IOS, iTunes, Kindle and Nook platforms. In Australia and New Zealand, the English volumes are distributed by Random House Australia. 63 English volumes have been released.



Volume list

References

Chapter 4